Olivellopsis is a genus of sea snails, marine gastropod mollusks in the family Bellolividae.

Species
 Olivellopsis amoni (Sterba & Lorenz, 2005)
 Olivellopsis simplex (Pease, 1868)

References

 Sterba G.H.W. & Lorenz F. (2005) Olivella (Janaoliva) amoni, a new subgenus and species from the Bismark Archipelago and Indonesia (Mollusca: Gastropoda: Olivellidae). Visaya 1(3): 43-46

External links
 
  Kantor Yu.I., Fedosov A.E., Puillandre N., Bonillo C. & Bouchet P. (2017). Returning to the roots: morphology, molecular phylogeny and classification of the Olivoidea (Gastropoda: Neogastropoda). Zoological Journal of the Linnean Society. 180(3): 493-541

Bellolividae
Gastropod genera